is a former Japanese football player.

Playing career
Koga was born in Shizuoka Prefecture on April 17, 1972. After graduating from Osaka University of Commerce, he joined newly was promoted to J1 League club, Cerezo Osaka in 1995. He played many matches as defensive midfielder. However he could hardly play in the match from 1998 and retired end of 1999 season.

Club statistics

References

External links

1972 births
Living people
Osaka University of Commerce alumni
Association football people from Shizuoka Prefecture
Japanese footballers
J1 League players
Cerezo Osaka players
Association football midfielders